Retsof is a hamlet and census-designated place (CDP) within the town of York in Livingston County, New York, United States. As of the 2010 census, it had a population of 340.

It was founded by a man named William Foster, Jr., who reversed the letters of his name to name the town, and it was the site of one of the world's largest salt mines until its collapse in 1994.

The original population of Retsof was mostly of Italian origin; they lived in a company town where the salt mine owned the houses and a store and maintained the small village. The Italian families lived together with a few non-Italians. The others who were mostly bosses lived on the "Avenue" in nicer houses with indoor plumbing.

In addition to the salt mine, there was a small railroad—the Genesee and Wyoming Railroad (G&W)—that took the salt to the "Main Lines" in neighboring towns. The G&W remains active today as a branch line of the Rochester and Southern Railroad.

Geography
Retsof is in northwestern Livingston County, in the southeastern part of the town of York. It is bordered to the east by the hamlet of Piffard and to the west by Greigsville. NY 63 leads southeast from Retsof  to Geneseo, the Livingston county seat, and northwest  to Batavia.

The community is drained by Salt Creek, a northward-flowing tributary of Bidwells Creek, which flows northeast to the Genesee River.

Demographics

Retsof Salt Mine 
In 1994, the Retsof Salt Mine was the largest salt mine in North America, and the second largest in the world. In March 1994, the ceiling in one of the large underground chambers collapsed, the first of a series of effects caused by groundwater entering the salt deposit, which had been dry for all of the 110 previous years of mining at the site. Over the next 21 months, the mine cavities collapsed and filled with water. Mining operations scrambled to work the accessible areas before the spreading flood, until operations were suspended when the mine was fully filled with water, in 1995.

The U.S. Geological Survey studied the effects of the mine collapse on groundwater hydrology in the surrounding watershed.

See also
 List of geographic names derived from anagrams and ananyms

References

Hamlets in New York (state)
Hamlets in Livingston County, New York
Census-designated places in New York (state)
Census-designated places in Livingston County, New York